K. V. Kuppam, or Kilvaithinankuppam, is a state assembly constituency in Tamil Nadu, India, formed after constituency delimitation in 2007. Its State Assembly Constituency number is 45. The seat is reserved for candidates from the Scheduled Castes. It is included in the Vellore parliamentary constituency for national elections. It is one of the 234 State Legislative Assembly Constituencies in Tamil Nadu.

Members of the Legislative Assembly

Election Results

2021

2016

2011

References

Assembly constituencies of Tamil Nadu